Arthrobacter roseus is a species of red-pigmented psychrophilic bacteria first isolated from a cyanobacterial mat.

References

Further reading
Whitman, William B., et al., eds. Bergey's manual® of systematic bacteriology. Vol. 5. Springer, 2012.

External links

LPSN
Type strain of Arthrobacter roseus at BacDive -  the Bacterial Diversity Metadatabase

Micrococcaceae
Psychrophiles
Bacteria described in 2002